Arman Salehi (born 29 October 1992 in Kalaleh, Golestan Province) is an Iranian volleyball player who plays as a libero for Iran and Shahrdari Gonbad VC. He made his maiden appearance at the Olympics representing Iran at the 2020 Summer Olympics.

Career 
He currently plays for Shahrdari Gonbad in the Iranian Super League. He was included in Iranian squad for the 2021 FIVB Volleyball Men's Nations League. He is part of the Iranian volleyball squad which is currently competing at the 2020 Summer Olympics.

References

External links 
 

Living people
1992 births
Liberos
Iranian men's volleyball players
Olympic volleyball players of Iran
Volleyball players at the 2020 Summer Olympics